Vaughtia dunkeri is a species of sea snail, a marine gastropod mollusk in the family Muricidae, the murex snails or rock snails.

Description
The length of the shell attains 13 mm.

The whorls are slightly shouldered, wide, with numerous ribs and revolving raised lines. The shell is yellowish, with a pale brown band. The aperture is large. The siphonal canal is short and open.

Distribution
This marine species occurs off Cape of Good Hope, South Africa.

References

 Lorenz, F. (1990). Further notes on South African Muricidae. La Conchiglia. 256: 12-17
 Lussi M. (2012) Description of three new species of Vaughtia from off the Eastern Cape, South Africa with a revision of the genus (Gastropoda: Prosobranchia: Muricidae) from Southern Madagascar. Malacologia Mostra Mondiale 76: 5-13.
  Houart, R.; Kilburn, R. N. & Marais, A. P. (2010). Muricidae. pp. 176-270, in: Marais A.P. & Seccombe A.D. (eds), Identification guide to the seashells of South Africa. Volume 1. Groenkloof: Centre for Molluscan Studies. 376 pp.

External links
 Krauss, F. (1848) Die Südafrikanischen Mollusken. Ein Beitrag zur Kenntniss der Mollusken des Kap- und Natallandes und zur Geographischen Verbreitung derselben mit Beschreibung und Abbildung der neuen Arten. Ebner and Seubert, Stuttgart, 140 pp., 6 pls., available online at https://www.biodiversitylibrary.org/page/13801704 page(s): 112, pl. 6, fig. 14
 Houart, R. (1995). Pterymarchia n. gen. and Vaughtia n. gen., two new muricid genera (Gastropoda: Muricidae: Muricinae and Ocenebrinae). Apex. 10 (4): 127-136.

dunkeri
Gastropods described in 1848
Taxa named by Christian Ferdinand Friedrich Krauss